This is a list of the leaders of the institution now known as the State University of New York Maritime College.

References
SUNY Maritime College Website
Fort Schuyler Maritime Alumni Association
 Maritime Industry Museum

 
State University of New York Maritime College
New York State University, Maritime College